Banská Bystrica (also known by other alternative names) is a middle-sized town in central Slovakia, located on the Hron River in a long and wide valley encircled by the mountain chains of the Low Tatras, the Veľká Fatra, and the Kremnica Mountains. With approximately 76,000 inhabitants, Banská Bystrica is the sixth most populous municipality in Slovakia. The present-day town was founded by German settlers during the Middle Ages (as part of the Ostsiedlung), however it was built upon a former Slavic/Slovakian settlement. 

It obtained the municipal privileges of a free royal town of the Kingdom of Hungary in 1255. The copper mining town acquired its present picturesque look in the late Middle Ages when the prosperous burghers built its central churches, mansions, and fortifications. It is the capital of the kraj (more specifically Banská Bystrica Region) and the okres (Banská Bystrica District). It is also the home of Matej Bel University. As a historical town with an easy access to the surrounding mountains, Banská Bystrica is a popular winter and summer tourist destination.

Etymology 

The Slovak name Banská Bystrica includes two roots: the adjective Banská from Slovak baňa – mine, and the name of the local river Bystrica (from Slavic bystrica – swift stream). The name of the town in  also comes from the Beszterce stream (from the Slavic name of the stream, Bystrica), and the suffix bánya is connected to the mines of the town. The river lent its name to the town as early as 1255 when the Latin name Villa Nova Bystrice (meaning "New Town of Bystrica") was recorded in the document in which King Béla IV of Hungary granted the town royal privileges.

Several variations of Bystrica (Byztherze, Bystrice, Bystrzice etc.) were then regularly used without the adjective identifying it as a mining town until the late 16th century. Although the first written record of the name Byzterchebana dates from 1263, it was rarely used afterwards. The Old German name Neusohl ("New Zvolen") (first recorded in 1300) and later its Latin version (Neosolium) reflected the fact that some early settlers came from the nearby town of Zvolen (at the time known in German as Altsohl, literally "Old Zvolen"). The two names have been used in parallel and even complementary (as in Novizolii Bistriciensis) throughout the history of the town. In the late 16th century the use of the mining adjective became more frequent (as in Bystrzicze na baniech or Bystricze Banska, both from 1530). This evolution resulted in the current form of the name, first recorded in 1773 as Banska Bystrica. In the Austrian Empire, the German name Neusohl was used until the compromise of 1867, when the Hungarian name Besztercebánya became the official one. The parallel use of Slovak or German names in the written record did not, however, cease in this period. Banská Bystrica became the official name of the town in 1920.

History 

The earliest history of Banská Bystrica was connected to the exploitation of its abundant deposits of copper (and to a lesser extent of silver, gold, and iron). The tools used by prehistoric miners at the locality called Špania Dolina have been dated to 2000–1700 BC. People of the Lusatian culture built their settlements at Špania Dolina, Horné Pršany, Malachov, and Sásová. Ancient hill fort locations are still reflected in the local toponym Hrádok, meaning "a small fort (later: castle)". The territory was inhabited by the Celtic tribe of the Cotini (Púchov culture) in the 3rd century BC. The Germanic tribe of the Quadi took over the place during the Roman Era, leaving for instance a hoard of silver artifacts in Netopierska jaskyňa (Bat Cave).

The present city was built upon a former Slavic settlement. After the Hungarian conquest of the Carpathian Basin it was incorporated in the Zólyom county of the Kingdom of Hungary. The first known stone church was built by Saxon immigrants in the then still independent settlement of Sásová in the first half of the 13th century, when the area belong to the king. According to Slovak archaeologists Banská Bystrica started as a permanent settlement in the 9th century. Other sources claim that due to the attack of Mongols, in 1243–44, the town ceased to exist. In 1255 King Béla IV granted Banská Bystrica extensive municipal privileges, in order to attract more skilled settlers. Descendants of the German immigrants to this and other counties became later known as the Carpathian Germans. The city flourished as a regional mining center. It built the Late Romanesque Church of the Virgin Mary in the second half of the 13th century. During the same period, Banská Bystrica obtained its own coat of arms inspired by the coat of arms of the ruling dynasty of the Árpáds, also used as the historical flag of the Kingdom of Hungary. The local craftsmen were organized in fifty guilds, with the butchers' guild being the oldest.

The affluent Fugger and Thurzo families founded the prosperous Ungarischer Handel company (German for "Hungarian Trade") in 1494. Depending mainly on the mines around Banská Bystrica, the company had become a leading world producer of copper by the 16th century. With the most sophisticated mining technologies in Europe, an advanced accounting system, and benefits including medical care for its 1,000 employees, Ungarischer Handel was one of the largest and most modern early-capitalist firms. An early record of the miners' industrial action is from 1526 when the City Council needed to take refuge within the confines of City Castle. The Ottoman Empire's thrust northwards led the magistrate to improve the city's fortifications with modern stone walls in 1589, but the Turks never occupied the region. Banská Bystrica became one of the foremost centers of the Protestant Reformation in the Kingdom of Hungary in the 16th century. Later on, the city had to fight for its religious freedom guaranteed by the Royal Charter against the ruling dynasty of the Austrian Roman Catholic Habsburgs, for its physical independence against the Ottoman Turks and for its self-governance against the Kingdom of Hungary's powerful magnates. In 1620, Prince Gabriel Bethlen of Transylvania, a Protestant, was elected King of Hungary by the Diet meeting at Banská Bystrica.

The village of Radvaň, now a borough of Banská Bystrica, was granted the economically important right to hold annual fairs (Radvanský jarmok) in 1655. The fair was transferred to Banská Bystrica's main square in the 20th century. The copper deposits had been all but depleted by the 18th century, but new industries, such as timber, paper, and textiles, developed. In 1766 the city became the capital of Zólyom county when Banská Bystrica also became the seat of a Roman Catholic bishopric (1776) and of several institutions of higher education. Public services expanded in the 19th century with the foundation of a permanent municipal hospital (1820), a municipal theater (1841), and a municipal museum (1889). The railway reached the town from Zvolen in 1873.

After Austria-Hungary lost the first world war, Banská Bystrica along with the entire northern part of Hungary was given to Czechoslovakia by the peace treaty of Trianon in 1920. 

During World War II, Banská Bystrica became the center of anti-Nazi opposition in Slovakia when the Slovak National Uprising, one of the largest anti-Nazi resistance events in Europe, was launched from the city on 29 August 1944. The insurgents were defeated on 27 October, and Banská Bystrica was briefly occupied by the German forces before it was liberated by Soviet and Romanian troops on 26 March 1945. After the war, Banská Bystrica became the administrative, economic, and cultural hub of central Slovakia. It has been a university town since the 1950s. Its largest Matej Bel University was founded in 1992.

Geography 
A chain of discrete suburbs and villages connects it with Zvolen, another major town  to the south.

Banská Bystrica is situated in the Hron River valley. The Hron River curves through the city from the east to the south. The city nests among three mountain chains: the Low Tatras to the north-east, the Veľká Fatra to the north-west, and the Kremnica Mountains to the west. All three are protected areas because of their environmental value. Banská Bystrica hosts the headquarters of the Low Tatra National Park. Despite the proximity of these mountain ranges, the local landscape is dominated by the much lower Urpín Mountain, which is a popular place of recreation.

Banská Bystrica lies in the north temperate zone and has a continental climate with four distinct seasons. It is characterized by a significant variation between hot summers and cold, snowy winters.

Demographics 

In 2013, the city had a total population of 79,368, making it the 6th-largest municipality in Slovakia in 2005. The population density was 790 per square kilometer in 2005.

The population was spread out, with 13.2% under the age of 15, 68.2% in the so-called productive age (15–54 years for women and 15–59 years for men), and 18.6% in the so-called post-productive age (over 54 years for women and over 59 years for men). For every 100 women there were 89.5 men. The population was slightly decreasing (by 423) in 2005, with the number of deaths (727) higher than the number of live births (673) and a negative migration rate. The life expectancy at birth was 75.1 years (as of 2001), which is a figure close to the median life expectancy in the European Union.

According to the 2001 census, the religious composition was 46.6% Roman Catholics, 30.2% people with no religious affiliation, and 13.9% Lutherans. People's ethnic self-identification was 94.7% Slovak and 1.4% Czech. Before World War II, the population of the city also included significant German, Hungarian, and Jewish minorities and many people were trilingual, mastering the Slovak, German, and Hungarian languages. The Jews resided for a long time in Radvaň because they used to be prohibited from entering the city. The synagogue in Banská Bystrica was built in 1867 and demolished in 1983.

Economy 

While Banská Bystrica's prosperity used to be derived from copper mining in the distant past, the most important sectors of the local economy are now tourism, timber, and mechanical industry. Two of the largest employers in Slovakia, Slovenská pošta (the public postal service, ranked as the 3rd largest employer) and Lesy SR (the national forest service, ranked as 13th). have their headquarters in Banská Bystrica. In the period 2007–2013, the city intends to work with Zvolen and other municipalities in the vicinity in order to jointly develop one of Slovakia's major metropolitan areas. The municipal strategy of economic development envisages Banská Bystrica as a regional center of tourism, services, administration, and entrepreneurship. The proclaimed three pillars of the future development are the natural and cultural heritage, information technologies, and infrastructure.

GDP per capita in 2001 was €3,643, which was below Slovakia's average (€4,400). GDP per capita for the Banská Bystrica Region (Banskobystrický kraj) in 2004 was PPS €10,148.70 (current euros), which was below Slovakia's average of PPS €12,196.20. More recent data disaggregated to the level of districts or municipalities are not available, but all of Slovakia's regional seats have per-capita GDPs above their region averages.
The unemployment rate in Banská Bystrica was 6.2% in December 2006, below the country's average of 9.4% at that time. The unemployment rate in the whole country has been decreasing since then, reaching 7.8% in November 2007.

The city has a balanced budget of more than one billion Slovak korunas (almost €33 million), with a small deficit of 37 million korunas. More than one fifth of the budget was used for investment. The highest revenue comes from the income tax of persons (437 million korunas in 2006).

Places of interest 

Most of the historical monuments are concentrated near its central, picturesque SNP Square, which teems with flowers and street cafes in the summer. The square is named after the Slovak National Uprising. It is dominated by a clock tower built in 1552. A plague column (Slovak: Morový stĺp) was erected in the square in the 18th century in gratitude to the Virgin Mary for ending a deadly plague. The column was temporarily removed before a visit of the Soviet leader Nikita Khrushchev in 1964 because a religious symbol was considered too embarrassing a background for the Communist leader's speech. The St. Francis Xavier Cathedral (Slovak: Kapitulský kostol, "Chapter Church") is a copy of the Jesuit Church of the Gesu in Rome and is since 1776 the seat of the Roman Catholic Diocese of Banská Bystrica. Other major monuments on the square include an Art Nouveau fountain from the beginning of the 20th century and a black obelisk raised to the honor of the Soviet soldiers killed during the liberation of the city in 1945.

Most buildings enclosing the square and in the nearby streets are well-preserved Gothic, Renaissance, and Baroque noblemen's mansions and wealthy burghers' residences. The most interesting among them are the Benicky House and the Thurzo House, the latter hosting a museum with a regional archaeological collection and remarkable Gothic frescos. Most of the buildings in the center have been transformed into luxury stores, restaurants, and cafes. SNP Square itself was completely reconstructed in 1994.

The museum located at the Memorial of the Slovak National Uprising contains a large military collection, including an open-air exhibition of World War II tanks, artillery, aircraft, and armored trains.

Banská Bystrica has also a large network of marked hiking trails all around the city. In wintertime, it attracts fans of cross-country skiing and downhill skiing, as there are a number of ski resorts close to the city, including the Donovaly resort famous for dogsled racing.

Town castle 

The oldest part of Banská Bystrica is town castle at the edge of SNP Square. It is enclosed within what has remained of its original fortifications − a barbican protecting the main gate, three bastions, and part of the walls. The town castle served as the town's administrative center and it also protected the king's treasury. The Parish Church (Slovak: Farský kostol) of the Assumption of the Virgin Mary built in the Romanesque and Gothic styles contains precious Gothic altars and sculptures. One of the altars was carved by the famous Master Paul of Levoča. The church was built in the 13th century. It is still surrounded by remnants of its ancient cemetery. The neighboring Church of the Holy Cross was built in 1452 by the Slovak burghers as a counterpart to the Church of the Virgin Mary that then acquired the attribute German. The Matthias House (Slovak: Matejov dom) was built in 1479 as a five-story late-Gothic structure with a Gothic portal and stone console balcony. It served as a temporary residence of King Matthias Corvinus and his Queen Consort Beatrix. The Renaissance Old Town Hall, dated from 1500, has been transformed into an art museum.

Culture 
There are four theaters in Banská Bystrica. The State Opera was founded in 1959. It has given the opera world several divas, Edita Gruberová being the most famous one. Every summer, the State Opera organizes a popular open-air festival at Zvolen Castle. Štúdio tanca is a professional contemporary dance theater established in 1998. A professional marionette theater, Bábkové divadlo na Rázcestí (Puppet Theater at the Fork in the Road) founded in 1960, organizes the only marionette festival in Slovakia. Theatre from the Passage (Slovak: Divadlo z Pasáže) is Slovakia's only theater with a mentally disabled cast whose mission is to help integrate mentally disabled people in society.

The oldest museum in the city is the Museum of Central Slovakia (Slovak: Stredoslovenské múzeum), founded in 1889. Its historical exposition is located in the Thurzo House on SNP Square, while the natural history exposition is in the Tihányi Mansion in Radvaň. The Old Town Hall building at City Castle hosts the State Gallery (Slovak: Štátna Galéria) specialized in contemporary Slovak art. The Museum of the Slovak National Uprising (Slovak: Múzeum Slovenského národného povstania) features a collection of 203,000 militaria, including an open-air exhibition of World War II heavy weapons. Other noteworthy museums are the regional Literature and Music Museum (Slovak: Literárne a hudobné múzeum) and Slovakia's only Postal Museum (Slovak: Poštové múzeum Slovenskej pošty).

The town is the setting for the book St Peter's Umbrella by Kálmán Mikszáth, published in 1895. The book was part of a large increase in Hungarian writing at the time, which was symptomatic of the rise in Hungarian separatism against what was seen as the oppression of the German Habsburgs.

From 22 to 28 February 1959 the first festival of the Czechoslovak cinema was presented in Banská Bystrica. While it was planned by Český film as a showcase of the national film production it turned into a tribunal for those films that did not fit the ideological guidelines of the Communist Party. Several films were banned, among them: Tri prání directed by Ján Kadár and Elmar Klos, Zde jsou lvi by Václav Krška, Hvezda jede na jih by Oldrich Lipský and Konec jasnovidce by Vladimír Svitáček and Ján Roháč.

There are four folklore ensembles for adults and three for children. Their aim is to preserve and present Slovak folklore traditions, especially the traditional music. The oldest one is the award-winning Urpín Folklore Ensemble, founded in 1957. Mladosť Folklore Ensemble is affiliated with University of Matej Bel.

FK Dukla Banská Bystrica is the local football club, playing in the top Slovak football league, the Corgoň Liga. They have their home ground at SNP Stadium, with a capacity of 10,000. Other clubs based in the city include the Extraliga ice hockey club HC 05 Banská Bystrica and the basketball club BKP Banská Bystrica.

Government 

The city is governed by a mayor and a city council (Slovak: mestské zastupiteľstvo). The mayor is the head of the city and its chief executive. The term of office is for four years. The current mayor following the 2014 municipal elections is Ján Nosko, an independent. Banská Bystrica is divided into four electoral districts, consisting of the following neighborhoods:
 Staré mesto, Uhlisko, Prednádražie, Šalková, Senica, Majer (7 councilors)
 Kráľová, Iliaš, Kremnička, Rakytovce (4 councilors)
 Radvaň, Fončorda, Podlavice, Skubín (11 councilors)
 Sásová, Rudlová, Uľanka, Jakub, Kostiviarska (10 councilors)

Banská Bystrica is the capital of one of eight largely autonomous Regions of Slovakia. It was the capital of an even larger region encompassing the whole of central Slovakia from 1960 until 1990, but the territory was subdivided in 1996 between the Banská Bystrica and Žilina regions, and a part of Trenčín region. Banská Bystrica is also the capital of a smaller district. The Banská Bystrica District (Slovak: okres Banská Bystrica) is entirely contained within the Banská Bystrica Region (Slovak: Banskobystrický kraj).

Several national public institutions have their headquarters in the city, the most prominent are the Tax Directorate of the Slovak Republic and the Slovak public postal service (Slovenská pošta). The city also hosts a regional branch of National Bank of Slovakia.

Education 

Banská Bystrica is the home of Matej Bel University with 16,460 students, including 416 doctoral students. Academy of Arts (Slovak: Akadémia umení) with 490 students is specialized in performing and fine arts. A satellite campus of the Slovak Medical University is also located in the city.

There are 15 public primary schools, two private primary schools, and two religious primary schools. Overall, they enroll 7,029 pupils. The city's system of secondary education (some middle schools and all high schools) consists of five gymnasia with 3,280 students, seven specialized high schools with 2,873 students, and six vocational schools with 1,884 students.

The largest library is the State Scientific Library with 2 million volumes. The geological institute of the Slovak Academy of Sciences has a branch in Banská Bystrica and the small Banská Bystrica Regional Astronomical Observatory is located on Urpín Mountain.

Transportation 

Banská Bystrica has bus and train connections to the rest of the country, as well as to many other European cities.

The R1 expressway connects the city to Zvolen and to Slovakia's capital Bratislava. Other roads of state importance connect the city to Brezno (No. 66), to Ružomberok (No. 59) and to Turčianske Teplice (No. 14).

Banská Bystrica railway station is a junction between the Vrútky–Zvolen railway, which links Banská Bystrica with Žilina and Bratislava, and the Banská Bystrica–Červená Skala railway, which heads east towards Košice. Banská Bystrica mesto railway station is a smaller station located closer to the city centre, served by trains on the Vrútky-Zvolen line.

The international Sliač Airport offers scheduled flights to Antalya and Burgas in summer, and charter flights to other destinations.

Public transport in the city is managed by two different companies. Dopravný podnik mesta Banská Bystrica is a public service run by the municipality. It operates trolleybuses and minibuses. The private company SAD Zvolen has a fleet of buses. In addition to regular lines, it also offers express and night lines. 30% of people use their private cars for journeys to work and the average commute time is 35 minutes.

Twin towns – sister cities 

Banská Bystrica is twinned with:

 Alba, Italy (since 1967)
 Ascoli Piceno, Italy (since 1998)
 Budva, Montenegro (since 2001)
 Charleston, United States (since 2010)
 Dabas, Hungary (since 2000)
 Durham, England, United Kingdom (since 1967)
 Halberstadt, Germany (since 1998)
 Herzliya, Israel (since 1995)
 Hradec Králové, Czech Republic (since 1967)
 Kovačica, Serbia (since 2002)
 Larissa, Greece (since 1988)
 Mangalia, Romania (since 2006)
 Montana, Bulgaria (since 1995)
 Radom, Poland (since 2001)
 Salgótarján, Hungary (since 1967)
 Tarnobrzeg, Poland (since 1995)
 Tula, Russia (since 1967)
 Vršac, Serbia (since 2004)
 Zadar, Croatia (since 1995)

Other forms of cooperation
 Jyväskylä, Finland (since 2006)
 Sumy, Ukraine (since 2016)
 Shenyang, China (since 2006)

See also 

 List of famous people from Banská Bystrica
 List of municipalities and towns in Slovakia

References

Further reading 
Kto bol kto v histórii Banskej Bystrice, 1255–2000; zostavili Anna Klimová, Mária Némethová. [Banská Bystrica]: Štátna vedecká knižnica v Banskej Bystrici, 2002.

Genealogical resources 

The records for genealogical research are available at the state archive "Statny Archiv in Banska Bystrica, Slovakia"

 Roman Catholic church records (births/marriages/deaths): 1628–1900 (parish A)
 Lutheran church records (births/marriages/deaths): 1743–1920 (parish A)

External links 

 Official municipal website of Banská Bystrica
 Basic information for tourists
 Comprehensive information about the city
 Another site for tourists
 Surnames of living people in Banska Bystrica

 
Cities and towns in Slovakia
Castles in Slovakia
Slovak National Uprising